The Branicki Palace is an 18th-century magnate's mansion in Warsaw, Poland.  It is located at the junction of Podwale and Miodowa Streets.

History
The Palace is one of three with the same name in Warsaw. This particular Branicki Palace is on Miodowa Street (the others are located on Nowy Świat Street and Na Skarpie Avenue).

The original building that stood where the palace now stands was a 17th-century mansion of the Sapieha family sold in the beginning of the 18th century to Stefan Mikołaj Branicki. This led to the current palace, built in 1740 by Johann Sigmund Deybel for Grand Crown Hetman Jan Klemens Branicki. Jan Henryk Klemm (1743), Jakub Fontana (1750) and sculptor Jan Chryzostom Redler also participated in the construction.

The now rococo palace was inspired by French palaces. The layout was shaped like a horseshoe, with a central part corps de logis and two side wings. The building was set back from the street by a cour d'honneur, a symmetrical courtyard set apart in this way, at which the honored visitors arrived. The façades were balanced with admirable rococo decoration and rooftop windows. The main entrance was decorated with a portico of four columns with sculptures on the top. The interiors were decorated in the rococo style by Johann Sigmund Deybel and Jakub Fontana. Later, a pavilion called "Buduar" was added to the south wing at the back.

The Branicki Palace previously had been called the Mrs Krakowska Palace, because after Branicki's death the property was inherited by his beautiful wife Izabella Poniatowska (1771), sister of king Stanisław August Poniatowski (Izabella was a daughter of Stanisław Poniatowski, Castellan of Kraków). She held a salon in the palace, and became known as a patron and gatherer of artists, intellectuals, and statesmen in the era of Enlightenment in Poland.

Shortly afterwards the Branicki Palace was sold in 1804 to the general Józef Niemojewski. The new owner improved the palace - two side outbuildings were added to the palace complex in 1804-1808 by architect Fryderyk Albert Lessel. From 1817 the palace was inhabited by the Stanisław Sołtyk.

During the Second World War, the estate was badly damaged (it was burned down in 1939 and demolished by the Germans during the Occupation of Poland), but after the war it was completely restored. It was rebuilt in 1967, based on  paintings by Bernardo Bellotto, and now houses Warsaw City Hall.

Images

See also
Branicki Palace, Białystok
Architecture of Warsaw
Tourist attractions in Warsaw

References

In-line:

General:

See also

 Branicki Palace, Białystok
 Palace under the Four Winds
 Brühl Palace, Warsaw

Houses completed in 1753
Rococo architecture in Warsaw
Rebuilt buildings and structures in Poland
Palaces in Warsaw